The Audi S5 is one of two high-performance variants of Audi's A5. It is also the coupé, cabriolet, and five-door fastback sedan versions of the fourth-generation (B8) Audi S4 saloon and estate models.

Like all Audi "S" cars, they are only available with Audi's quattro four-wheel drive (4WD) system, here in S5 using a Torsen-based centre diff system.

Most versions of the S5 are manufactured at Audi's plant in Ingolstadt, Germany; they are available as a coupé, cabriolet, and five-door sportback, which was previously not available in North America until the 2018 model year, which was released in the United States in mid 2017. The cabriolets are built at Audi's factory in Neckarsulm, Germany.

S5 B8/8T (2007–2017)
The Audi S5 was released in coupé form to the public at the same time as the A5. The Audi S5 Sportback was unveiled at the 2009 Frankfurt Motor Show, and went on sale in the spring of 2010 with a MSRP of €57,900.

The Audi S5, in comparison to the A5, features a more aggressive body style (typical design for Audi S and RS models) which consists of side skirts, bigger air inlets on the front bumper and a dual-quad tip exhaust. The S5 includes a string of LED daytime running lights around the bi-Xenon headlamps and a vertically striped chrome grille. In many markets, the S5 includes as standard 19" alloy wheels with a five-parallel spoke design, larger brakes, heated leather sport bucket seats, and other convenience features, some of which are available only as an option on the A5. Changes for 2010 model year included LED tail lamps, the introduction of Premium Plus and Prestige trim levels and new optional equipment such as leather/Alcantara seats.

Despite sharing the same nameplate, the powertrains were different between the coupé and the Cabriolet/Sportback for the 2010–2012 model years. The 2007–2012 Audi S5 coupé had a 4.2-litre Fuel Stratified Injection (FSI) V8 engine that produced , while the S5 Cabriolet and Sportback have a supercharged 3.0-litre TFSI V6 engine producing  which was shared with the 2010 Audi S4 3.0 TFSI quattro sedan and avant. The coupé had a choice of either a 6-speed manual or 6-speed Tiptronic, while the Cabriolet/Sportback have the 7-speed S-tronic dual-clutch transmission. Despite minor differences in peak power output, both the V8 and the supercharged V6 provide very similar performance.

S5 B8.5/8.5T (2013–2017)
The (B8.5/8.5T or Facelift) Audi S5 went through a mid-generational refresh alongside the standard Audi A5. There are front-end changes, including a complete redesign of the headlights – this means new LED DRL's, a brand-new grille loosely based on the 2012 Audi A6 grille and new fog lamps. Audi has also introduced a new rear diffuser that appears to be more cosmetic than the one found on previous models and updated LED tail light design.

Instead of the 4.2 FSI V8 engine producing , the facelifted S5 Coupé is powered by a 3.0-litre supercharged V6 TFSI engine producing , the latter which had been used in the S5 Cabriolet and S4 Sedan/Avant since the 2010 model year. The other major change under the bonnet is the introduction of stop-start technology for better fuel efficiency.

Inside, the S5 receives some new features. Dials in the center console get the chrome treatment along with the edges of the buttons for the windows, four Audi MMI control buttons and Audi's 3G+ MMI which has a slightly refreshed interface and now features Google Earth maps. Audi has brought the shift knob from the RS5 to the S5. There is a shift from having four buttons down each side of the console, to just two with the addition of a Menu and Car buttons below the MMI control dial (Audi has removed the skip forward / backward buttons that previously occupied the space on either side of the back button). Lastly, a flat-bottom steering wheel style will have a new circular airbag cover as well as piano black trim.

S5 B9 (2017–present)
The Audi S5 (B9) is an all-wheel drive coupé, sportback, & cabriolet built by Audi from late 2017, after its unveiling in June 2016. Its sportback trim adds rear doors and a hatchback rear. It is part of the second generation model line following on from the Audi S5 (B8) that had been in production since 2007.

There are also a number of optional safety options available such as drive assist and head up display. Inside, the S5 also receives some new features. A redesigned dashboard and centre console, updated tablet style 8" Audi MMI, Virtual Cockpit (optional), and features Google Earth maps and Apple CarPlay. The new Audi S5 also has new electrically adjustable front heated seats with cross stitching, and has an optional flat-bottom steering wheel style with circular airbag cover as well as a variety of trim options.

Fitted with a completely new and more powerful 3-litre V6 petrol engine, the S5 has direct injection as well as a twin-scroll turbocharger to reduce both weight, and cost. The turbocharger is mounted within the engine V and as a result has reduced turbo lag response times. The quattro all-wheel drive system receives power through a locking centre differential that splits torque sent to the wheels at 40% to the front and 60% to the rear.

In 2019, Audi introduced a new facelifted version of the B9 for the 2020 models, the B9.5. In Europe, the new 2019 S5 was only made available with a diesel V6 TDI engine.

Engines

See also

References

External links
Audi.com - international corporate portal
Audi UK - S and RS models
Audi USA - S5

S5
Cars introduced in 2007
Compact executive cars
Coupés
Convertibles
Hatchbacks
Sports sedans
All-wheel-drive vehicles